Oketo is a former Yurok settlement in Humboldt County, California. It was located 10 mi (16 km) north of Trinidad.

References

Former settlements in Humboldt County, California
Former Native American populated places in California
Yurok villages
Lost Native American populated places in the United States